1922 Egypt Cup Final, was the final match of the 1921–22 Egypt Cup and the 1st Egypt cup final, was between El-Mokhtalat (Zamalek SC now) and Al Ittihad Alexandria, El-Mokhtalat won the match 5–0, became the 1st team to win Egyptian cup.

Route to the final

Match details

References

External links
http://www.angelfire.com/ak/EgyptianSports/ZamalekInEgyptCup.html#1922

1922
EC 1922
EC 1922